Events from the year 1648 in Denmark.

Incumbents 
 Monarch — Christian IV (until 28 February), Frederick III
 Steward of the Realm — Corfitz Ulfeldt

Events 

 28 February – King Christian IV dies in his bedchamber at Rosenborg Castle where he has been moved from Frederiksborg Castle upon his own order.
 6 July  Frederick III signs his håndfæstning, which is the most restrictive of its kind to date.
 23 November – Coronation of Frederick III.
 24 November – Coronation of Queen Sophie Amalie. By that time, the triumphal arch has already been dismantled, giving rise to various speculations and rumors, particularly relating to Corfitz Ulfeldt and his party.

Undated 
 Ove Gjedde resigns as Admiral and settles as a feudal magnate at Helsingborg Castle.
 Nicholas Mercator is employed by University of Copenhagen.

Publications

 Physician and botanist Simon Paulli publishes the first , not to be mistaken with the later, more famous work of the same name from the 18th century. Published in Latin but translated into Danish by a student, it strongly discourages the growing use of tobacco and tea.

Births 
 Poul Christian Schindler, composer (died 1740)

Deaths 
 28 February – Christian IV, King of Denmark (born 1577)
 27 April  Vibeke Kruse, royal mistress
 30 September   Steen Beck, statesman and landholder (born 1603)

References 

 
Denmark
Years of the 17th century in Denmark